The Galloping Ghost may refer to:

People
 Red Grange (1903–1991), American football player
 Norm Perry (Canadian football) (1904–1957), Canadian football player
 Brian Bevan (1924–1991), legendary rugby league winger

Other uses
 The Galloping Ghost (aircraft), a destroyed P-51 Mustang air racer
 Buford and the Galloping Ghost, a 1978 cartoon
 The Galloping Ghost (serial), a 1931 movie serial
 USS Enterprise (CV-6), a 1936 American aircraft carrier during World War II
 Galloping Ghost Arcade, a video arcade in Brookfield, Illinois